One Track Mind is the second album by rapper Egyptian Lover.  The album was released in 1986 for Egyptian Empire Records and was produced by Egyptian Lover himself.  The album reached #37 on the Billboard R&B albums chart and produced two charting singles, "The Lover" and "Freak-a-Holic".

Track listing
"One Track Mind" – 5:26
"You're So Fine" – 2:36
"The Dark Side of Egypt" – 4:22
"Livin' on the Nile" – 1:11
"Freak-A-Holic" – 4:36
"The Lover" – 5:30
"The Alezby Inn" – 5:53
"Los Angeles" – 3:36
"Kinky Nation (Kingdom Kum)" – 3:18

References

Egyptian Lover albums
1986 albums
Albums produced by Egyptian Lover